Archibald Button (born 1770) was an English amateur cricketer who made two known appearances in first-class matches from 1798 to 1804.

He was mainly associated with Hampshire.

References

1770 births
English cricketers
English cricketers of 1787 to 1825
Hampshire cricketers
People from West Thurrock
Surrey cricketers
Year of death unknown